Aaron Dennis (born February 24, 1993) is a United States Virgin Islands soccer player who plays for New York Cosmos in the National Premier Soccer League.

Career

College and amateur
Dennis played four years of college soccer at Villanova University between 2011 and 2014. He scored 15 goals during his time at Villanova.

While at college, Dennis also appeared for Premier Development League sides Long Island Roughriders and Ocean City Nor'easters.

Professional
Dennis signed with United Soccer League side Arizona United on August 5, 2015. He moved to new North American Soccer League club Miami FC on January 21, 2016. On February 20, 2018, Dennis signed with USL side Penn FC for 2018 season. He joined New York Cosmos on January 7, 2019.

International goals
Scores and results list the United States Virgin Islands' goal tally first.

See also 
 List of top international men's football goalscorers by country

References

External links
 

1993 births
Living people
American soccer players
Villanova Wildcats men's soccer players
Long Island Rough Riders players
Ocean City Nor'easters players
Phoenix Rising FC players
Miami FC players
Penn FC players
USL League Two players
USL Championship players
Soccer players from New York (state)
United States Virgin Islands soccer players
Association football forwards
People from Elmont, New York
New York Cosmos (2010) players
United States Virgin Islands international soccer players